The 2019 European Triathlon Championships was held in Weert, Netherlands from 30 May to 2 June 2019.

Medal overview

Medal table

References

External links 
 Official page

European Triathlon Championships
Triathlon in the Netherlands
European Triathlon Championships
European Triathlon Championships
International sports competitions hosted by the Netherlands
European Triathlon Championships
European Triathlon Championships
Sport in Weert
Sports competitions in Limburg (Netherlands)